Lake Kaltern is a lake in the municipality of Kaltern in South Tyrol, Italy.

References 
Civic Network of South Tyrol

External links 

Lakes of South Tyrol